Pierrick Fédrigo (born 30 November 1978) is a French former racing cyclist, who rode professionally between 2002 and 2016 for the , ,  and  teams. He was the winner of the French National Road Race Championships in 2005, and won four stages at the Tour de France.

Career
Fédrigo won 4 stages of the Tour de France: Stage 14 at Gap in 2006, Stage 9 at Tarbes in 2009, and two stages in Pau: Stage 16 of the 2010 race, and Stage 15 of the 2012 edition. In the 2010 edition, he was part of a select group that conquered two Hors Catégorie climbs and two Category one climbs. He battled it out with his seven breakaway companions in the final sprint, which included Lance Armstrong, and prevailed. Fédrigo has also won races including the Four Days of Dunkirk in 2005 and the Criterium International in 2010. His nickname is "le nez de Marmande" (The nose of Marmande) due to his remarkable nose. In September 2014,  announced that they had signed Fédrigo for 2015. In August 2016 Fédrigo announced that he would retire from competition after the GP Ouest-France.

Major results

1999
 1st Flèche Ardennaise
 5th Overall Ronde de l'Isard
1st Stage 5
2001
 10th Grand Prix d'Isbergues
2002
 1st Stage 3 Paris–Corrèze
 2nd Overall Tour de l'Avenir
 3rd Overall Tour du Limousin
1st  Young rider classification
1st Stage 4
 3rd Tour du Doubs
 6th Grand Prix d'Isbergues
2003
 5th Overall Tour de l'Avenir
1st Stage 6
 5th Grand Prix d'Ouverture La Marseillaise
2004
 1st Overall Tour du Limousin
1st Stage 2
 3rd Route Adélie
 3rd À travers le Morbihan
 4th Overall Four Days of Dunkirk
 5th Overall Étoile de Bessèges
 5th Grand Prix de Villers-Cotterêts
 6th Tour de Vendée
 7th Trophée des Grimpeurs
 8th Cholet-Pays de Loire
 8th Polynormande
 9th Paris–Camembert
2005
 1st  Road race, National Road Championships
 1st  Overall Four Days of Dunkirk
 1st Cholet-Pays de Loire
 8th Trophée des Grimpeurs
2006
 1st Stage 4 Four Days of Dunkirk
 1st Stage 14 Tour de France
 2nd Overall Route du Sud
 2nd Overall Tour du Limousin
1st Stage 1
 2nd Tour du Finistère
 7th GP Ouest–France
2007
 1st  Overall Tour du Limousin
 2nd Road race, National Road Championships
 5th Tour de Vendée
 6th Tour du Haut Var
 6th Grand Prix de Plumelec-Morbihan
2008
 1st GP Ouest–France
 3rd Overall Étoile de Bessèges
 3rd Overall Four Days of Dunkirk
1st Stage 4
 5th Overall Tour du Limousin
 8th Overall Volta a Catalunya
1st Stage 3
 9th Tour du Finistère
2009
 Critérium du Dauphiné Libéré
1st  Mountains classification
1st Stage 6
 1st Stage 9 Tour de France
 2nd Tour du Finistère
 2nd GP Ouest–France
 6th Overall Four Days of Dunkirk
1st Stage 5
 8th Overall Tour du Haut Var
 10th Overall Étoile de Bessèges
2010
 1st  Overall Critérium International
1st  Points classification
1st Stage 1
 1st Stage 16 Tour de France
 2nd Les Boucles du Sud-Ardèche
 3rd Classic Loire Atlantique
 4th Grand Prix de Plumelec-Morbihan
 5th Overall Tour du Haut Var
 10th Overall Étoile de Bessèges
 10th Overall Four Days of Dunkirk
2011
 2nd Grand Prix Cycliste de Montréal
 2nd Grand Prix de Plumelec-Morbihan
 4th Overall Étoile de Bessèges
 4th Overall Circuit de la Sarthe
 5th Overall Four Days of Dunkirk
 5th Paris–Camembert
 8th Overall Critérium International
 10th Les Boucles du Sud-Ardèche
2012
 1st Stage 15 Tour de France
 2nd Overall Critérium International
1st Stage 3
 4th Grand Prix de Plumelec-Morbihan
 4th Boucles de l'Aulne
 5th Cholet-Pays de Loire
 6th Overall Four Days of Dunkirk
 7th Overall Étoile de Bessèges
 9th Overall Circuit de la Sarthe
 10th Overall Tour du Haut Var
2013
 1st Paris–Camembert
 4th Overall Tour du Haut Var
 6th Overall Étoile de Bessèges
 7th Overall Tour du Limousin
 8th Overall Critérium International
 9th Overall Circuit de la Sarthe
2014
 4th Cholet-Pays de Loire
 10th La Drôme Classic
 10th Grand Prix de Plumelec-Morbihan
2015
 1st Cholet-Pays de Loire
 2nd Paris–Camembert
 3rd Grand Prix de Plumelec-Morbihan
 4th Overall Critérium International
 4th Boucles de l'Aulne
 5th Polynormande
 6th Grand Prix de la Somme
 9th Overall Circuit de la Sarthe
2016
 4th Overall Four Days of Dunkirk
 8th Classic Loire Atlantique

Grand Tour general classification results timeline

References

External links

 
 
 
 
 
 
 
 
  
  

1978 births
Living people
French male cyclists
Olympic cyclists of France
Cyclists at the 2008 Summer Olympics
French Tour de France stage winners
2010 Tour de France stage winners
2012 Tour de France stage winners
People from Marmande
French people of Italian descent
Sportspeople from Lot-et-Garonne
Cyclists from Nouvelle-Aquitaine